Khomuli Cave Natural Monument is a karst cave located  3.7 km to the south from  village Khomuli, Tsqaltubo Municipality in Imereti region of Georgia,  160 meters above sea level.

Morphology 
Khomuli karst cave was formed in limestones. Total length - 4 kilometers. In the front of the cave entrance, on the surface, there is an oval-shaped lake, 5 meters deep  and 30 meters in circumference. Through the underground waterways lake is connected to the Tsqaltubo water reservoir (Tsivi Lake). At the cave entrance there is a raised cornice. Cave is divided into two parts. The main part is rather extensive with numerous karst formations, some looks like footprints. The other part is a narrow tunnel, which can be accessed only with special equipment.  At the bottom of the tunnel there is a small lake.

See also 
Sataplia Strict Nature Reserve

References

Natural monuments of Georgia (country)
Caves of Georgia (country)
Protected areas established in 2011
Geography of Imereti